Helmuth Emil Froschauer (22 September 1933 – 18 August 2019) was an Austrian conductor, especially a choral conductor who received his first training as a member of the Wiener Sängerknaben. He conducted the choir from 1953 to 1965, including 22 international tours. He went on to conduct the choirs of the Wiener Singverein, the Vienna State Opera and the WDR Rundfunkchor Köln. As a close collaborator of Herbert von Karajan from 1989, he prepared choirs for the Salzburg Festival among others.

Life and career 
Born in Vienna, Froschauer received his musical education with the Wiener Sängerknaben boys' choir. He studied piano, horn, composition and conducting at the Wiener Musikakademie.

From 1953 to 1965 he conducted one of the choirs of the Wiener Sängerknaben. As Kapellmeister he led this ensemble on 22 international tours. He conducted the choir in recordings and the film Almost Angels. At the beginning of the 1960s, as musical director of the Walt Disney Productions in Vienna, he also directed several music films with the Vienna Symphony Orchestra. From 1968 to 1991 Froschauer was, at times simultaneously, solo répétiteur and choir director at the Vienna State Opera as well as choir director of the Wiener Singverein and the Bregenzer Festspiele.

As a close collaborator of Herbert von Karajan from 1989, he was involved in the preparation of numerous concerts, recordings, and television recordings at Salzburg Festival, Berliner Festwochen, and Wiener Festwochen.

Froschauer worked for the Westdeutscher Rundfunk Köln from 1992, first as choir director of the WDR Rundfunkchor Köln, then from 1997/99 to 2003 also as chief conductor of the WDR Rundfunkorchester Köln, of which he later became honorary conductor.

For many years, Froschauer and two other colleagues have also conducted the Sunday masses in the Vienna , in which the Wiener Sängerknaben also took part. Froschauer died in Vienna at age 85.

His son is the violinist Daniel Froschauer, chairman of the Vienna Philharmonic.

References

Further reading 
 Ralf Noltensmeier: Konzertgespräche. Musik im Dialog. Götzelmann, Kiel 2001, .

External links 

 
 
 

1933 births
2019 deaths
Musicians from Vienna
20th-century Austrian conductors (music)
Male conductors (music)
20th-century Austrian male musicians
21st-century Austrian conductors (music)
21st-century male musicians